Jesse Garcia (born December 14, 1982) is an American actor.

Career
Garcia starred in the award-winning film Quinceañera, written and directed by Wash Westmoreland and Richard Glatzer with executive producer Todd Haynes, which won both the Grand Jury Prize and the Audience Award at the 2006 Sundance Film Festival in the Dramatic Independent Feature Competition. Quinceañera was also selected to play at the 2006 Berlin Film Festival. Garcia won Best Actor at the 2007 ALMA Awards for his role as Carlos, a troubled gay teenager, in Quinceañera. He appeared in the thriller Locker 13 in 2009. He recently made a cameo appearance on Marvel's The Avengers in 2012.

Garcia was born in Rawlins, Wyoming, and spent most of his childhood in Hanna, Wyoming. He was raised as a Jehovah's Witness, though he no longer practices that faith. his sister one year younger worked oilfield trucking for over 19 years. His father is from the Mexican state of Durango and his mother, a native of Wyoming, is of Spanish and Mexican descent.

He appeared in the 2010 revival of The Pee-wee Herman Show and in the 2010 music video of Wisin & Yandel's "Estoy enamorado".

Filmography

Television

Films

References

External links
 
 

1982 births
Living people
American male film actors
Male actors from Wyoming
People from Rawlins, Wyoming
Former Jehovah's Witnesses
American male actors of Mexican descent